Paul Schwartz (born 1 April 1940, București) is the current president of the Jewish Community of Bucharest, Romania. He is also the current vice-president of the Federation of Jewish Communities of Romania, holding two mandates with the first starting in 2005.

Paul Schwartz has been a mechanical engineer and developer of numerous trade patents for the former 23 August factory in Bucharest (renamed "FAUR" after the Romanian Revolution of 1989).

For his achievements in helping develop Romania from a technical and economical point of view,  in 2009, Paul Schwartz was decorated by the then President of Romania, Traian Băsescu, becoming a Knight of the Order of Industrial and Commercial Merit.

Mr. Schwartz is married since 1980 and has one son.

References 

1940 births
Living people
Politicians from Bucharest
Engineers from Bucharest
Romanian Jews